WKES (91.1 MHz) is a non-commercial, listener-supported FM radio station broadcasting a Christian talk and teaching radio format. Licensed to Lakeland, Florida, it serves the Tampa Bay area from its studios at Keswick Christian School in Seminole.  The station is owned by the Moody Bible Institute of Chicago and features programming from Moody Radio.

WKES is the flagship station of the statewide Moody Radio Florida network, which includes:

Local programming includes New Day Florida (a morning show) and Prime Time Florida (a drive-time afternoon show), plus hourly news and traffic updates, along with weather updates from former Bay News 9 meteorologist Alan Winfield.

History
The station first signed on May 20, 1975, at 91.3 MHz as WCIE, a religious station owned by the Carpenter's Home Church in Lakeland. In 1980, as part of a plan to increase its power, the station relocated to 91.1 MHz. In 1997, in a three way swap, Carpenter's Home sold WCIE to Paxson Broadcasting, who in turn swapped the station with Moody's WKES, which at the time was on 101.5 FM. WKES would soon move to 91.1 FM; after a brief simulcast period, its old 101.5 frequency became a commercial station under Paxson, as WILV (now WPOI, owned by Cox Radio).

Translators

External links

Central Florida Radio: WCIE
WCIE tribute page 

KES
Moody Radio
Radio stations established in 1975
1975 establishments in Florida